MICROCOSM is Flow's sixth studio album. The album comes into two editions: regular and limited. The limited edition includes a bonus DVD. It reached #9 on the Oricon charts  and charted for 5 weeks.

Track listing

Bonus DVD Track listing

References

Flow (band) albums
2010 albums